The Parish of Wamboin is a parish of the County of Murray, a cadastral unit for use on land titles. It is located just to the north-east of the Australian Capital Territory and includes part of the town of Bungendore on the eastern edge and the rural community of Wamboin near the south-western edge.

Part of Lake George is the boundary in the north-east. The Yass River is the boundary in the west. Turallo Creek is the boundary in the east. Main roads in the area include Norton Road, Weeroona Drive and the eastern parts of Bungendore Road.

The parish was formerly located in Yarrowlumla Shire, as shown in old parish maps. They also record the area being part of the Gundaroo gold field that was proclaimed on 10 January 1873.

References
New South Wales Parish maps preservation project
Map showing proposed Federal Capital Territory and tenures of land within same, Charles Robt. Scrivener, 22 May 1909
 
Parish of Wamboin, County of Murray, National Library of Australia

Parishes of Murray County